The Campbell Hills are a low range of hills in southern Butte County, California. Some southern elevations overlook the Thermalito Afterbay, Oroville, and Oroville Airport.

References 

Mountain ranges of Northern California
Mountain ranges of Butte County, California